Mustafabeyli is a Turkic place name and may refer to:

Mustafabeyli, Adana, a town in Ceyhan district of Adana Province, Turkey
Mustafabəyli, a village in Saatly Rayon, Azerbaijan